Survivor: Redemption Island is the twenty-second season of the American CBS competitive reality television series Survivor. It premiered on February 16, 2011. Applications were due in January 2010, and filming lasted from August to September 2010. The season was filmed near San Juan del Sur, Nicaragua, the same location as the previous season. The show featured returning players Russell Hantz and Rob Mariano and 16 new players to Survivor.

Mariano was named the winner in the final episode on May 15, 2011, defeating Phillip Sheppard and Natalie Tenerelli in an 8–1–0 vote. In addition, Mariano won $100,000 as the "Sprint Player of the Season," receiving 40% of the fans' votes; Matt Elrod, with 36%, received the next-highest total.

Redemption Island
This season introduced "Redemption Island" to the American version of Survivor, based in part on concepts already used in foreign versions of the show, including "Moondram Ulagam" (3rd Island) in the Tamil version. "The Island of the Dead" in the Israeli version, "Isla Purgatoryo" (Purgatory Island) in the Philippine version's second season, "Ghost Island" in the Serbian version's second season, and the duels in the 2002 Swedish edition. 

Instead of being out of the game immediately upon being voted out of their tribe, the voted off contestant would be taken to a secluded area known as Redemption Island. Once there, they were to sustain themselves in the same manner as when living with the tribe: living on limited food, water and shelter. They would be joined by the next person voted out, and those two people would face off in a duel in an arena constructed to resemble an old ruined temple, joined by two representatives from each tribe acting as observers. The winner remains in the game, and continues living at Redemption Island. The loser exits the game for good, throwing their buff into a small fire pit on their way out of the arena.  At two predetermined points during the game, at the merge and with four players remaining in the game proper, the winner of the Redemption Island duel returns to the game.

Host Jeff Probst compared Redemption Island to the Pearl Islands Outcast tribe, stating that the latter concept did not seem to work well with the audience because the Outcast twist was not revealed to the players ahead of time, and was considered unfair to the remaining players in the game. However, the Outcast tribe survived on the same meager rations as everybody else in the game. With Redemption Island, the players were told at the start of the game of the existence and rules of Redemption Island, and Probst expected that this would affect how the tribes would vote out members. Probst also stated that the change would allow for the newer players to have a chance to recover from early mistakes such as choosing the wrong alliance or making a poor vote at Tribal Council. Entertainment Weeklys Dalton Ross correctly speculated that due to the Redemption Island duel as part of each episode, all regular challenges in the show were combined Reward/Immunity challenges until the tribes merged. The duels used at Redemption Island were scaled-back versions of previous challenges the show had used, and Probst stated that this was because these challenges "worked well" and eliminated any risk of the challenges going astray. The idea for allowing other players to watch the duel was a last-minute addition made by Mark Burnett.  According to Probst, it gave those that attended the duel "valuable information" they could have used in their gameplay strategy, but also could have left them vulnerable to alliance shifts that might have occurred while they were absent from the tribe.

Contestants

The players were initially split into two tribes of nine, each with one returning player: Ometepe and Zapatera, both named after the islands in Lake Nicaragua. Redemption Island featured the return of Rob Mariano and Russell Hantz, who both previously appeared on Survivor: Heroes vs. Villains and appeared separately on Marquesas and All-Stars (Mariano) and Samoa (Hantz). Their feud was a running storyline in the early episodes of Heroes vs. Villains, and was rekindled months later during the season's live finale. While the sixteen new players were initially assigned tribes prior to the start of the game, Rob and Russell drew buffs to determine which tribe they joined. 

Notable new contestants include former NFL players Steve Wright and Grant Mattos; and former Miss Maine USA Ashley Underwood.

Future appearances
Phillip Sheppard, Andrea Boehlke, and Francesca Hogi returned for Survivor: Caramoan. Natalie Tenerelli and Stephanie Valencia were included on the public poll to choose the cast of Survivor: Cambodia, but neither received enough votes to be chosen. Boehlke returned for the third time in Survivor: Game Changers. Russell Hantz returned to the game on an international level as he appeared on the 2018 edition of Australian Survivor. Rob Mariano returned for the thirty-ninth season Survivor: Island of the Idols serving as a mentor to new contestants, and returned to compete on Survivor: Winners at War.

Season summary
Sixteen new castaways, previously divided into two tribes, Ometepe and Zapatera, were joined by returning contestants, "Boston" Rob Mariano and Russell Hantz, with Rob joining Ometepe and Russell joining Zapatera by random draw. The tribes were then told about Redemption Island, a secluded location where voted out players would go to compete in challenges for a chance to return to the game.

Rob quickly proved to be leader of Ometepe, and kept wary of the hidden immunity idol, including sending one of his own alliance, Matt, to Redemption Island while trying to flush it out. On Zapatera, the bulk of the tribe recognized the threat that Russell could be, throwing a challenge in order to vote Russell out; Russell would lose to Matt at the next Redemption Island challenge. Matt would continue to win several more duels. After Russell's elimination, Zapatera faltered due to lack of cohesion within the tribe, and eventually approached the merge with only five members remaining, while Ometepe had six.

The tribes merged with 12 players left in the game, including Matt, who returned from Redemption Island. Zapatera attempted to lure Matt to their side in order to tie the vote; while Matt considered blindsiding Rob, he eventually decided against it, telling this to Rob in an attempt to prove his loyalty. Despite this, Rob decided Matt could not be trusted, using his alliance to send Matt back to Redemption Island, establishing a firm Ometepe majority. The former Ometepe tribe used their numerical advantage to completely eliminate the remaining former members of Zapatera, starting with Mike, who dominated with his close friend Matt at Redemption Island. Meanwhile, Rob orchestrated the eliminations of those who he felt would be threatening to him, including close allies Grant and Ashley. The final three were Rob, Natalie, and Phillip; both Natalie and Phillip were criticized by the jury for simply following in Rob's footsteps, and Rob was voted the Sole Survivor in a vote of 8-1-0.

In the case of the immunity and reward winner being able to share their reward with others, the invitees are in brackets.

Episodes

Voting history

Reception
The season was universally panned by critics. The primary criticisms are that Redemption Island itself ruined the drama and significance of the elimination, that the cast as a whole was boring and unlikable, and that once Russell Hantz was eliminated, the competition became unfairly favorable to Rob Mariano. Survivor columnist of Entertainment Weekly Dalton Ross ranked it as the 10th-worst season, stating that "the fuse blew out" after the first three episodes, and also that "Most of the vote-offs were clearly telegraphed and the Redemption Island twist sucked the life out of the signature moment - the vote-off." Survivor: Tocantins runner-up and People'''s Survivor columnist Stephen Fishbach stated that he thought it was the worst season ever. In 2013, Andrea Reiher of Zap2it ranked it as the worst season of Survivor, saying "this season continually felt like one big 'let's win Boston Rob the Survivor title' game orchestrated by the producers for three months," and also criticized the Ometepe tribe as "a tribe full of gomers who were too star-struck to act against [Rob]," which "became more and more boring." In 2014, Joe Reid of The Wire ranked Redemption Island as the worst season of the series, similarly noting that "The coronation of Boston Rob was a foregone conclusion from the earliest stages...The whole season had an air of uselessness around it, and we'd have all been better off if CBS had just aired a 30-minute special where Les Moonves wrote Mariano a check." Reid also described the entire new cast as being "full of lemmings and idiots." Since 2012, Survivor fan site "Survivor Oz" has consistently ranked Redemption Island as the worst season ever in its annual polls ranking every season of the series. It was also ranked as the worst season of all time in 2015 on former Survivor contestant and reality TV podcast host Rob Cesternino's website, both by Cesternino himself and by the fan poll. This was updated in 2021 during Rob's Survivor All-Time Top 40 Rankings podcast where the listeners ranked it 39th out of 40 seasons. Fellow Survivor fan site "The Purple Rock Podcast" ranked Redemption Island as the sixth-worst season in 2020, describing it as "generally boring and predictable television." Inside Survivor ranked this season last out of the first 40 seasons citing the Redemption Island twist and Mariano's "vice grip on the game". Despite the negative reception of the season, the gameplay of Mariano was still well-received by fans. Mariano placed 4th out of the first 34 winners in a fan poll conducted by Entertainment Weekly in 2017. In the official CBS Watch issue commemorating Survivor''s 15th anniversary, Mariano was voted by viewers as the greatest contestant in the history of the series.

References

External links
 Official CBS Survivor Redemption Island Website

2010 in Nicaragua
2011 American television seasons
Rivas Department
22
Television shows filmed in Nicaragua